Pleasant Grove is an unincorporated community in Pleasant Grove Township, Olmsted County, Minnesota, United States, near Rochester and Stewartville.  The community is located along Olmsted County Road 1 near County Road 140.

History
Pleasant Grove was platted in 1854, and named for a grove of oak trees near the original town site. A post office was established at Pleasant Grove in 1854, and remained in operation until 1905.

Notable person
 Augustus Barrows (1838–1885), lumberman and legislator

References

Former municipalities in Minnesota
Unincorporated communities in Olmsted County, Minnesota
Unincorporated communities in Minnesota